Formosa (The Beautiful Island) is a Taiwanese folk song by Lee Shuang-tze (李雙澤). The song was adapted from Chen Hsiu-hsi (陳秀喜)'s poem Taiwan by Liang Ching-fong (梁景峰) and is among the most famous of Lee's works.

History 
In 1980, the Government Information Office officially banned the song "Formosa". However, in 1990 (three years after martial law was lifted in Taiwan), the general leader of the Wild Lily student movement melodiously sang it.

In 2006, Million Voices against Corruption, President Chen Must Go (百萬人民倒扁運動) and  led supporters in a rendition of "Formosa".

On 20 May 2016, at the inauguration ceremony of Tsai Ing-wen as president, people sang the song along with her and Vice President Chen. There was a protest on this event on Facebook by the indigenous people of Taiwan, who felt that the ceremony was full of Chinese chauvinism.

Lyrics controversy 

Taiwanese aboriginal poet  (莫那能) is Lee Shuang-tze's friend. After a long night of drinking, the poets began to sing. Lee said to him, "Brother, I just wrote a song. Let me sing it to you," at which point Lee then sang "The Beautiful Island." Monaneng then asked some questions about the song after he had heard it: "Why does the song mention Water buffalo (水牛), rather than the Formosan black bear?"; "Why say 'cut the tree' (以啟山林)? Our ancestors say one can't cut trees of nature." But Lee did not answer.

References

External links 
 

Taiwanese songs
Taiwan in fiction
Mandarin-language songs